Saraqutu (Quechua sara maize, qutu heap, "maize heap",  Hispanicized spelling Saraccoto) is a mountain in the Arequipa Region in the Andes of Peru, about  high. It is situated in the La Unión Province, in the districts Cotahuasi and Tomepampa, and in the Condesuyos Province, Salamanca District. Saraqutu lies west of the mountains Sunqu Urqu and Kuntur Sayana.

References 

Mountains of Peru
Mountains of Arequipa Region